Miguel Alfredo Bosch Marín was a sailor from Argentina, who represented his country at the 1928 Summer Olympics in Amsterdam, Netherlands.

Sources
 

Argentine male sailors (sport)
Sailors at the 1928 Summer Olympics – 8 Metre
Olympic sailors of Argentina
1905 births
Year of death missing
Sportspeople from Buenos Aires